Polikarpov Design Bureau was a Soviet OKB (design bureau) for aircraft, led by  Nikolai Nikolaevich Polikarpov. Dux Factory was acquired by the USSR and became part of Polikarpov.

After the death of Polikarpov on 30 July 1944 at the age of 52, his OKB was absorbed into Lavochkin, but with some of its engineers going to Mikoyan-Gurevich and its production facilities going to Sukhoi. For a long time the Polikarpov OKB headquarters were located at Aircraft plant #1 (formerly Dux Factory) in Moscow, where its purpose-built building still stands.

Designs
Polikarpov designs:

Bombers
 TB-2 twin-engined biplane bomber prototype, 1930
 SPB (D) twin-engined dive bomber developed from the VIT-2, 1940
 NB (T) medium bomber prototype, 1944

Fighters
 I-1 (IL-400) monoplane fighter prototype, 1923
 DI-1 (2I-N1) twin-seat biplane fighter prototype, 1926
 I-3 biplane fighter, 1928
 DI-2 two-seat biplane fighter developed from the I-3, 1929
 I-6 biplane fighter prototype, 1930
 I-5 biplane fighter, 1930
 I-13/ANT-32 fighter project, 1931
 I-15 Chaika biplane fighter, 1933
 I-16 fighter, 1933
 I-15-2/I-152 (I-15bis) prototype modernized version of I-15, 1938
 I-15-3/I-153 Chaika biplane fighter
 I-17 fighter prototype, 1934
 I-180 prototype fighter developed from the I-16, 1938
 I-185 prototype fighter developed from the I-180, 1941
 I-190 biplane fighter prototype developed from I-153, 1939
 I-200 (MiG-1) fighter
 TIS (MA) twin-engined heavy fighter prototype, 1941
 ITP (M) fighter prototype, 1942
 Malyutka rocket-powered fighter, abandoned incomplete upon Polikarpov's death

Ground attack
 VIT-1 twin-engined attack aircraft prototype, 1937
 VIT-2 development of VIT-1, 1938
 Ivanov ground attack aircraft prototype, 1938

Reconnaissance
 R-1 unlicensed copy of the British Airco DH.9A bomber.
 MR-1 floatplane version of R-1 with wooden floats. 124 built.
 MR-2 (PM-2) floatplane version of R-1 with Munzel metal floats. 1 built.
 R-2 biplane reconnaissance aircraft based on R-1.
 R-4 biplane reconnaissance aircraft (R-1 development, not produced).
 R-5 biplane reconnaissance aircraft, 1928.
 SSS light bomber development of R-5.
 R-Z reconnaissance/light bomber, developed from the R-5, 1935.

Airliners/transport
 PM-1 (P-2) biplane airliner
 P-5 light transport version of R-5
 PR-5 airliner developed from R-5
 PR-12 monoplane airliner development based on the PR-5, 1938
 P-Z commercial variant of R-Z
 BDP (S) transport glider
 MP powered version of the BDP
 Limozin (D) light transport aircraft, abandoned incomplete upon Polikarpov's death

Trainers
 Po-2/U-2 "Mule" general purpose biplane, 1928
 P-2 biplane trainer, 1927

References

Aircraft manufacturers of the Soviet Union